The Once and Future King is a collection of fantasy novels by T. H. White about the legend of King Arthur. It is loosely based upon the 1485 work Le Morte d'Arthur by Sir Thomas Malory. It was first published in 1958 as a collection of shorter novels published from 1938 to 1940, with some new or amended material. The title refers to a legend that Arthur will one day return as king.

Summary
Most of the book takes place in Gramarye, the name that White gives to Britain, and chronicles the youth and education of King Arthur, his rule as a king, and the romance between Sir Lancelot and Queen Guinevere. Arthur is supposed to have lived in the 5th and 6th centuries, but the book is set around the 14th century.  Arthur is portrayed as an Anglo-Norman rather than a Briton; White refers to the actual monarchs of that period as "mythical". The book ends immediately before Arthur's final battle against his illegitimate son Mordred. White acknowledged that his book's source material is loosely derived from Le Morte d'Arthur, although he reinterprets the events of that story from the perspective of a world recovering from World War II.

The book is divided into four parts:
 The Sword in the Stone (1938), detailing the youth of Arthur (a revised text of the original publication, which both adds and removes certain parts)
 The Queen of Air and Darkness (1939), published separately in somewhat different form as The Witch in the Wood
 The Ill-Made Knight (1940), dealing mainly with the character of Lancelot
 The Candle in the Wind (1958), first published in the composite edition

A final part called The Book of Merlyn (written 1941, published 1977) was published separately following White's death. It chronicles Arthur's final lessons from Merlyn before his death, although some parts of it were incorporated into the final editions of the previous books, mostly The Sword in the Stone, after White became aware that the compiled text of The Once and Future King would not include his final volume. The Book of Merlyn was the volume that first contained the adventures with the ants and the geese. However, it still has independent value as the only text in which all Arthur's animals are brought together, and the final parts of his life are related.

Plot
The story starts in the final years of the rule of King Uther Pendragon. The first part, "The Sword in the Stone", chronicles Arthur's upbringing by his foster father Sir Ector, his rivalry and friendship with his foster brother Kay, and his initial training by Merlyn, a wizard who lives through time backwards. Merlyn, knowing the boy's destiny, teaches Arthur (known as "Wart") what it means to be a good king by turning him into various kinds of animals: fish, hawk, ant, goose, and badger. Each of the transformations is meant to teach Wart a lesson, which will prepare him for his future life.

Merlyn instills in Arthur the concept that the only justifiable reason for war is to prevent another from going to war and that contemporary human governments and powerful people exemplify the worst aspects of the rule of Might.

White revised the original Sword in the Stone heavily for the four-part book in 1958. He took out the wizards' duel between Merlyn and Madame Mim, the adventure with T. natrix the snake, and the episode with the giant Galapagas. The first of those was replaced with the adventure of the ants. In the Wart's adventure with Merlyn's owl, Archimedes, the boy Arthur becomes a wild goose instead of visiting the goddess Athena. In the adventure with Robin Hood in the original book, the outlaws take the boys to attack the  Anthropophagi (cannibals) and the Wart kills a Sciopod. In the 1958 version, the boys lead an attack on Morgan le Fay's Castle Chariot and Kay kills a griffin. The revisions reflect White's preoccupation with political questions in The Once and Future King, and generally give the first part of the work a more adult flavour.

In part two, The Queen of Air and Darkness, White sets the stage for Arthur's demise by introducing the Orkney clan and detailing Arthur's seduction by their mother, his half-sister Queen Morgause. While the young king suppresses initial rebellions, Merlyn leads him to envision a means of harnessing potentially destructive Might for the cause of Right: the chivalric order of the Round Table.

The third part, The Ill-Made Knight, shifts focus from King Arthur to the story of Sir Lancelot and Queen Guinevere's forbidden love, the means they adopt to hide their affair from the King (although he already knows of it from Merlyn), and its effect on Elaine, Lancelot's sometime lover and the mother of his son Galahad.

The Candle in the Wind unites these narrative threads by telling how Mordred's hatred of his father and Sir Agravaine's hatred of Lancelot cause the eventual downfall of Arthur, Guinevere, Lancelot, and the entire ideal kingdom of Camelot.

The book begins as a quite light-hearted account of the young Arthur's adventures and King Pellinore's interminable search for the Questing Beast. Parts of The Sword in the Stone read almost as a parody of Arthurian legend by virtue of White's prose style, which relies heavily on anachronisms. However, the tale gradually changes tone: The Ill-Made Knight becomes more meditative, and The Candle in the Wind finds Arthur brooding over death and his legacy.

Characterization in the work
White reinterprets the traditional Arthurian characters, often giving them motivations or traits more complex than or even contradictory to those in earlier versions of the legend. For example:

 Arthur grows from a fallible but inquisitive and enthusiastic youth ("the Wart") to an individualised and psychologically complex man.
 Lancelot is no longer the handsome knight typical in the romances, but is instead portrayed as the ugliest of Arthur's knights. He is also intensely introspective and obsessively insecure, traits which lead to bouts of self-loathing. He seeks to overcome his flaws by becoming Arthur's greatest knight.
 Merlyn lives through time backwards, making him a bumbling yet wise old man who is getting younger. He makes many anachronistic allusions to future events, including references to World War II, telegraphs, tanks, and "an Austrian who … plunged the civilized world into misery and chaos" (i.e., Adolf Hitler).
 Sir Galahad is not well liked by many of the knights, as he is too "perfect"—to the point of being inhuman.
 Sir Bors (whom White labels "Sir Bors the misogynist") is depicted as so devoted to his religious convictions that he is willing to do harm to others and the world around him rather than risk sacrificing his purity. His holy goodness is juxtaposed with Sir Lancelot's worldly goodness, with many of the characters favouring Lancelot.

Reception
Floyd C. Gale praised The Sword in the Stone as "blithely comic and entirely delightful", stating that it was "in utter contrast to the mounting tragedy" of the other three volumes of the series. Fantasy historian Lin Carter called it "the single finest fantasy novel written in our time, or for that matter, ever written." Constance Grady of Vox also praised the novel, stating: "White was writing for a post–World War II audience, but his book has a vigor and clarity that makes it an urgent and important read today."

Film, television, and theatrical adaptations
Although Walt Disney initially purchased the film rights to The Ill-Made Knight in 1944, he eventually produced an adaptation of The Sword in the Stone (released in 1963). This movie reflects more the sense of humour of Disney's team of animators than White's. The movie adds a more comical side to the original story, including song and dance, as in most Disney films.

Alan Jay Lerner and Frederick Loewe's 1960 musical Camelot (which was made into a movie in 1967) is based mostly on the last two books of The Once and Future King and features White's idea of having Thomas Malory make a cameo appearance at the end, again as "Tom of Warwick".

BBC Radio produced a dramatised version of "The Sword in the Stone" for Children's Hour shortly after its publication in 1938.  Incidental music for the serial was specially composed by Benjamin Britten.

A two-hour version of The Sword in the Stone, dramatised by Neville Teller, was first broadcast as a Saturday Night Theatre on Boxing Day, 1981.  Michael Hordern played Merlyn and Toby Robertson was the Wart.  The cast included Pauline Letts, David Davis, Jeffrey Segal and Lewis Stringer.  Benjamin Britten's incidental music, played by the English Sinfonia, was used in the production, which was by Graham Gauld.

BBC Radio 4 serialised the book in six one-hour episodes dramatised by Brian Sibley, beginning on Sunday 9 November 2014 with Paul Ready as Arthur and David Warner as Merlyn.

Other references

Film
 George A. Romero's film Knightriders (1981) references The Once and Future King as the inspiration for a travelling Camelot of motorcycle-riding knights aspiring to the code of chivalry.
 The film X2 (2003) begins one scene with Magneto reading the first edition of The Once and Future King in his prison cell. At the end of the film, Xavier is using the book as a teaching tool.
 In the film Bobby (2006) Edward Robinson (Laurence Fishburne) relates the novel's depiction of King Arthur to the selfless and chivalrous qualities of Jose Rojas (Freddy Rodriguez).
 The film X-Men: Apocalypse (2016) shows Charles Xavier reading lines from The Once and Future King with his students.
 In Lorenzo's Oil (1992), Michaela reads The Once and Future King aloud to Lorenzo.

Literature
 In Rodman Philbrick's Freak the Mighty (1993) Max Kane and Kevin Dillon bond through the book; and, inspired by Dillon's fits of fancy, the two embark on a quest to embody the heroic qualities of King Arthur.
 The Magicians by Lev Grossman includes a long sequence where magicians-in-training are transformed into geese, a "direct and loving homage" to Wart's transformation in The Sword in the Stone.
Jim Butcher uses the title of Queen of Air and Darkness as an epithet of Queen Mab, ruler of the Winter Fae and the Unseelie Sidhe in The Dresden Files.
Cassandra Clare uses the title Queen of Air and Darkness (2018) for the naming of her third book in The Dark Artifices series as a reference to White's second story.

Comics
 In the Marvel Universe, the X-Men comics mention The Once and Future King several times, notably in the first issue of the "X-Tinction Agenda" story arc, which mentions that the book is Professor X's favourite, and that Xavier always saw himself as Merlyn, the teacher guiding the hero(es), rather than as a hero himself.  
 In the "Ultimate X-Men" comics, the book is a metaphor for Magneto, an extremely powerful mutant terrorist.
 "Once & Future", a comic by Kieron Gillen where Arthurian legends return in modern times, directly copies the title.

Television
 The animated series Gargoyles references The Once and Future King when King Arthur is awakened in Avalon.
 The TV series Merlin talks about "The Once and Future King" throughout the series, the first time said by the Great Dragon to Merlin about his destiny.
 In Netflix series House of Cards, President Underwood quotes an excerpt from King Arthur's monologue "I Know What My People Are Thinking Tonight" from the musical film Camelot (1967) based on the musical stage version of Camelot (1960).
 The Starz series Blunt Talk references The Once and Future King several times as it is Walter Blunt's favourite story.

References

External links

 
 
 "The Once and Future King" Study Guide at Wikibooks
 "NLS/BPH: Minibibliographies, The Once and Future King" by T. H. White
 Essay: "The Importance of the Second World War to T.H. White's Once and Future King".
 1958 review by Ken Slater

1958 British novels
1958 fantasy novels
Modern Arthurian fiction
British fantasy novels
Reboot (fiction)
Novels by T. H. White
William Collins, Sons books
British novels adapted into films